The Orchestre de la Suisse Romande (OSR) is a Swiss symphony orchestra, based in Geneva at the Victoria Hall. In addition to symphony concerts, the OSR performs as the opera orchestra in productions at the Grand Théâtre de Genève.

History
Ernest Ansermet founded the OSR in 1918, together with Paul Lachenal, with a contingent of 48 players and a season of six months' duration. Besides Swiss musicians, the OSR players initially came from other countries, including Austria, France, Germany and Italy. Ansermet gradually increased the percentage of Swiss musicians in the orchestra, attaining 80% Swiss personnel by 1946. He remained the music director of the OSR for 49 years, from 1918 to 1967.

A Swiss radio orchestra based in Lausanne was merged into the OSR in 1938. Subsequently, the OSR began to broadcast radio concerts regularly on Swiss radio. The orchestra had a long-standing contract for recordings with Decca Records, dating from the tenure of Ansermet, and made over 300 recordings for Decca, starting in 1947 with Debussy's La mer. The OSR premiered many works of the Swiss composers Arthur Honegger and Frank Martin. During the directorship of Armin Jordan (1985–1997), the OSR continued to make recordings on the Erato label.

From 2005 to 2012, Marek Janowski was the artistic director and music director of the OSR. He conducted the OSR in recordings for the Pentatone label. In September 2008, his initial 5-year contract had been extended to 2015, but in January 2010, in a change to the September 2008 contract extension, Janowski and the OSR mutually agreed on the scheduled conclusion of his directorship of the OSR after the 2011–12 season.

Following the announcement of Janowski's scheduled 2012 departure, attempts to secure Bertrand de Billy and Kazuki Yamada as the OSR's next artistic leader did not come to fruition. In September 2010, the OSR named Neeme Järvi as its ninth artistic and musical director, and in parallel, Yamada as principal guest conductor, with both appointments effective as of 2012, with initial contracts of 3 years for both conductors.  Järvi has commercially recorded with the OSR for the Chandos label.  He concluded his OSR directorship after the 2014–2015 season.

Jonathan Nott first guest-conducted the OSR in October 2014. Following these concert appearances, in January 2015, the OSR named Nott its next music and artistic director, effective January 2017. The OSR formalised the new contract and relationship with Nott in March 2016. In February 2021, the OSR announced the conversion of Nott's OSR contract into an evergreen, open-ended lifetime agreement with no set final date.

Artistic and musical directors
 Ernest Ansermet (1918–1967)
 Paul Kletzki (1967–1970)
 Wolfgang Sawallisch (1970–1980)
 Horst Stein (1980–1985)
 Armin Jordan (1985–1997)
 Fabio Luisi (1997–2002)
 Pinchas Steinberg (2002–2005)
 Marek Janowski (2005–2012)
 Neeme Järvi (2012–2015)
 Jonathan Nott (2017–present)

References

External links

 Orchestre de la Suisse Romande official website
 Discogs.com page on discography of OSR

Musical groups established in 1918
Swiss orchestras
Decca Records artists
1918 establishments in Switzerland